Zee Studios is an Indian entertainment company that specializes in film, streaming & television content development & production, as well as film marketing & distribution. It is based in Mumbai, India.

Established in 2012 as the content engine for Zee Entertainment Enterprises Limited.

With the success of The Kashmir Files in 2022, Zee Studios has reinvigorated its focus on movies that mix excellent content with powerful performers and develop strong story-driven films across several Indian languages, like some of its previously made films, including critically acclaimed Sairat, Mom, the Aamir Khan starrer Secret Superstar, Manikarnika: The Queen of Jhansi, The Tashkent Files, Qismat 2, Bangarraju and Thunivu.

Festivals

 Aatmapamphlet, has been selected for the generation 14+ competition at the 2023 Berlin International Film Festival.

 Manoj Bajpayee starrer, Joram was officially selected at the International Film Festival Rotterdam 2023.

 Brown, starring Karisma Kapoor is  the only Indian web series to be premiered at the Berlinale Market Selects 2023.

 Yami Gautam starrer Lost had its Asian premiere at the International Film Festival of India. It was also selected as the opening film at Chicago South Asian Film Festival and the closing film at the Atlanta Film Festival. 

 Vaalvi won Best Feature Film at the Chicago South Asian Film Festival.

Film productions and distribution

Television

Current productions

Former productions

See also 
Essel Vision Productions

External links
ZEE Entertainment Corporate Website – Extraordinary Together

References

Indian film studios
Zee Entertainment Enterprises
Mass media companies established in 2012
Indian companies established in 2012
2012 establishments in Maharashtra